Sir Jonathan Wolfe Miller CBE (21 July 1934 – 27 November 2019) was an English theatre and opera director, actor, author, television presenter, humourist and physician. After training in medicine and specialising in neurology in the late 1950s, he came to prominence in the early 1960s in the comedy revue Beyond the Fringe with Peter Cook, Dudley Moore and Alan Bennett.

Miller began directing operas in the 1970s. His 1982 production of a "Mafia"-styled Rigoletto was set in 1950s Little Italy, Manhattan. In its early days, he was an associate director at the National Theatre. He later ran the Old Vic Theatre. As a writer and presenter of more than a dozen BBC documentaries, Miller became a television personality and public intellectual in Britain and the United States.

Life and career

Early life 
Miller grew up in St John's Wood, London, in a well-connected Jewish family. His father Emanuel (1892–1970), who was of Lithuanian descent and suffered from severe rheumatoid arthritis, was a military psychiatrist and subsequently a paediatric psychiatrist at Harley House. His mother, Betty Miller (née Spiro) (1910–1965), was a novelist and biographer who was originally from County Cork, Ireland. Miller had an elder sister, Sarah (died 2006) who worked in television for many years and retained an involvement with Judaism that Miller, as an atheist, always eschewed. The young Miller was brought for assessment to several child psychiatrists, including Donald Winnicott. As a teenager he had many sessions with the psychiatrist Leopold Stein, whose sessions he enjoyed and in which they "simply conversed about philosophy and Hughlings Jackson's early neurological theories."

Miller moved between several different schools prior to attending Taunton School, including for a time at the Rudolf Steiner School Kings Langley (a Waldorf school) where he was taught by two of Ivy Compton-Burnett's sisters and says of that time that he "never learnt anything at all".  Miller concluded his secondary school education at St Paul's School, London where he developed an early (and ultimately lifelong) interest in the biological sciences. While at St Paul's School at the age of 12, Miller met and became close friends with Oliver Sacks and Sacks's best friend Eric Korn, friendships which remained crucial throughout the rest of their lives. In 1953, before leaving secondary school, he performed comedy several times on the BBC radio programme  Under Twenty Parade. Miller studied natural sciences and medicine at St John's College, Cambridge (MB BChir, 1959), where he was a member of the Cambridge Apostles before going on to train at University College Hospital in London.

While studying medicine, Miller was involved in  the Cambridge Footlights, appearing in the revues Out of the Blue (1954) and Between the Lines (1955). Good reviews for these shows, and for Miller's performances in particular, led to his performing on a number of radio and television shows while continuing his studies; these included appearances on Saturday Night on the Light, Tonight and Sunday Night at the London Palladium. He qualified as a physician in 1959 and then worked as a hospital house officer for two years, including at the Central Middlesex Hospital as house physician for gastroenterologist Francis Avery Jones.

1960s: Beyond the Fringe

Miller helped to write and produce the satirical  revue Beyond the Fringe, which premiered at the Edinburgh Festival in August 1960. This launched, in addition to his own, the careers of Alan Bennett, Peter Cook and Dudley Moore. Miller quit the show shortly after its move from London to Broadway in 1962, and took over as editor and presenter of the BBC's arts programme Monitor in 1965. The Monitor appointment arose because Miller had approached Huw Wheldon about taking up a place on the BBC's director training course. Wheldon assured him that he would "pick it up as he went along".

Miller's first experience of directing a stage-play was for John Osborne, whose Under Plain Cover he directed in 1962. In 1964, he directed the play The Old Glory by the American poet Robert Lowell in New York City. It was the first play produced at the American Place Theatre and starred Frank Langella, Roscoe Lee Brown, and Lester Rawlins. The play won five Obie Awards in 1965 including an award for "Best American Play" as well as awards for Langella, Brown and Rawlins.

He wrote, produced, and directed an adaptation for television of Alice in Wonderland (1966) for the BBC. He followed this with Whistle and I'll Come to You (1968) starring Michael Hordern, a television adaptation of M. R. James's 1904 ghost story "Oh, Whistle, and I'll Come to You, My Lad". He produced a National Theatre Company production of The Merchant of Venice starring Sir Laurence Olivier. He later resigned as associate director.

1970s: Medical history and opera
Miller held a research fellowship in the history of medicine at University College London from 1970 to 1973. In 1974, he also started directing and producing operas for Kent Opera and Glyndebourne, followed by a new production of The Marriage of Figaro for English National Opera in 1978. Miller's other turns as an opera director included productions of Rigoletto (in 1975 and 1982) and the operetta The Mikado (in 1987).

Miller drew upon his own experiences as a physician as writer and presenter of the BBC television series The Body in Question (1978), which caused some controversy for showing the dissection of a cadaver. For a time, he was a vice-president of the Campaign for Homosexual Equality. In 1971, he defended multiracial immigration to the UK at length with Enoch Powell on The Dick Cavett Show.

1980s: Shakespeare and neuropsychology
In 1980, Miller was persuaded to join the troubled BBC Television Shakespeare project (1978–85). He became producer (1980–82) and directed six of the plays himself, beginning with a well received Taming of the Shrew starring John Cleese. In the early 1980s, Miller was a popular and frequent guest on PBS' Dick Cavett Show.

Miller wrote and presented the BBC television series, and accompanying book, States of Mind in 1983 and the same year directed Roger Daltrey as Macheath, the outlaw hero of the BBC's production of John Gay's 1728 ballad opera, The Beggar's Opera. He also became chair of Edinburgh Festival Fringe board of directors. In 1984, he studied neuropsychology with Dr. Sandra Witelson at McMaster University in Hamilton, Ontario, Canada, before becoming a neuropsychology research fellow at the University of Sussex the following year.

1990s
In 1990, Miller wrote and presented a joint BBC/Canadian production titled, Born Talking: A Personal Inquiry into Language. The four-part series looked into the acquisition of language, and complexities surrounding language production, with special focus on sign language used by deaf people. This interest was contemporaneous with his friend Oliver Sacks' immersion in, and writing/publishing a book about Deaf Culture and deaf people entitled Seeing Voices.  Miller then wrote and presented the television series Madness (1991) and Jonathan Miller on Reflection (1998). The five-part Madness series ran on PBS in 1991. It featured a brief history of madness and interviews with psychiatric researchers, clinical psychiatrists, and patients in therapy sessions. In 1992, Opera Omaha staged the United States premiere of the Gioachino Rossini's 1819 opera Ermione, directed by Miller.

2000s: Atheism and return to directing
In 2004, Miller wrote and presented a television series on atheism entitled Atheism: A Rough History of Disbelief (more commonly referred to as Jonathan Miller's Brief History of Disbelief) for BBC Four, exploring the roots of his own atheism and investigating the history of atheism in the world. Individual conversations, debates and discussions for the series that could not be included due to time constraints were aired in a six-part series entitled The Atheism Tapes. He also appeared on a BBC Two programme in February 2004, called What the World Thinks of God appearing from New York. The original three-part series aired on public television in the United States in 2007.

In 2007, Miller directed The Cherry Orchard at The Crucible, Sheffield, his first work on the British stage for 10 years. He also directed Monteverdi's L'Orfeo in Manchester and Bristol, and Der Rosenkavalier in Tokyo and gave talks throughout Britain during 2007 called An Audience with Jonathan Miller in which he spoke about his life for an hour and then fielded questions from the audience. He also curated an exhibition on camouflage at the Imperial War Museum. He appeared at the Royal Society of the Arts in London discussing humour (4 July 2007) and at the British Library on religion (3 September 2007).

In January 2009, after a break of 12 years, Miller returned to the English National Opera to direct his own production of La bohème, notable for its 1930s setting. This same production ran at the Cincinnati Opera in July 2010, also directed by Miller.

2010s
On 15 September 2010 Miller, along with 54 other public figures, signed an open letter published in The Guardian, stating their opposition to Pope Benedict XVI's state visit to the UK. In April and May 2011, Miller directed Verdi's La traviata in Vancouver, Canada, and in February and March 2012, Mozart's Così fan tutte in Washington, D.C.

On 25 November 2015 the University of London awarded Miller an honorary degree in Literature.

Personal life
Miller married Rachel Collet in 1956. They had two sons and a daughter. From 1961 to his death he lived on Gloucester Crescent in Camden Town, north London. On 27 November 2019, Miller died at the age of 85, following a long battle with Alzheimer's.

Parodies and representations
 Stevie Smith, a friend of his mother Betty Miller, "rather disloyally" included a thinly disguised and uncomplimentary version of the nine-year-old Miller, "precocious and brattish... constantly demanding attention", in her short story 'Beside the Seaside: A Holiday with Children' (1949).
Private Eye (which had a falling-out with Miller) occasionally lampooned him under the name "Dr Jonathan", depicting him as a Dr Johnson-like self-important man of learning.
 In the film for television Not Only But Always about the careers of Peter Cook and Dudley Moore, Jonathan Aris played Jonathan Miller as a young man; Aris reprised the role in the BBC Radio 4 play Good Evening (2008) by Roy Smiles.
 Along with the other members of Beyond the Fringe, he is portrayed in the play Pete and Dud: Come Again by Chris Bartlett and Nick Awde.
In the BBC Radio Four series The Burkiss Way edition 35, broadcast on 2 April 1979, he was impersonated by Nigel Rees in a fairly lengthy parody "The Blood Gushing All over the Screen in Question", in which the history of nasty diseases was traced and the style of Miller's presentation was  sent up. It was written by Andrew Marshall and David Renwick.
 In the 1980s a puppet of Miller appeared frequently in Spitting Image sketches, most notably "Bernard Levin and Jonathan Miller Talk Bollocks".

Honours and awards
Special Tony Award (1963), with co-stars Alan Bennett, Peter Cook, Dudley Moore, "for their brilliance which has shattered all the old concepts of comedy" in the musical revue Beyond the Fringe.
Distinguished Supporter, Humanists UK.
Honorary Associate, National Secular Society.
Honorary Fellow, University College London.
Honorary Fellow, Royal College of Art.
Associate member, Royal Academy of Dramatic Art.
Honorary Fellow, St John's College, Cambridge (1982).
Honorary Fellow, Royal College of Physicians (London and Edinburgh).
Honorary D.Phil., University of Cambridge.
Commander of the Order of the British Empire (CBE; 1983).
Nomination: Best Director Tony Award (1986), for his revival of O'Neill's Long Day's Journey into Night.
Knight Bachelor (2002), for services to music and the arts.
Nominated artist of honour at Bornholm thanks to his instruction in Rønne Theater (Opera Island Bornholm; 2003).
Foreign Member, American Academy of Arts and Sciences.
President, Rationalist Association (2006–2019)
Lifetime Achievement Award, Medical Journalists' Association (2012)

Bibliography

Books
 
 
 
 
 
 
  (1994 Jonathan Cape [pop-up book])
 
  (pop-up book intended for children)
 
 
  (The Applause Acting Series)
  (University Research Lecture Series No. 5)
 
 
  [collection of his photographs]

Editor

Contributor
 
 
 
  – Jonathan Miller: "King Lear in Rehearsal: A Talk" and seven other essays
 
 . Essays by Jonathan Miller Geoffrey O'Brien, Charles Rosen, Tom Stoppard and Garry Wills

Introductions and forewords
  (directors note)

Discography

Actor
Bridge on the River Wye (1962 Parlophone LP; as American Announcer, American G.I., American Lieutenant, British Sergeant)

Filmography

Actor
Beyond the Fringe (1964), TV version.
 One Way Pendulum (1964)
Sensitive Skin (as "Dr Cass", 2 episodes, 2005)

Director
Alice in Wonderland (1966; BBC television drama; Also writer and producer; Provides commentary track on DVD version)
Whistle and I'll Come to You (1968; BBC television drama).
Take a Girl Like You (1970, starring Hayley Mills).
BBC Television Shakespeare (1978–85):
The Taming of the Shrew (1980), starring John Cleese.
Timon of Athens (1981), starring Jonathan Pryce.
Antony and Cleopatra (1981), starring Colin Blakely.
Othello (1981), starring Anthony Hopkins and Bob Hoskins.
Troilus and Cressida (1981).
King Lear (1982), starring Michael Hordern.
The Beggar's Opera (1983; BBC television opera), starring Roger Daltrey and Bob Hoskins.

Presenter-writer
Monitor (1962; also editor).
The Zoo in Winter (1969), BBC, directed by Patrick Garland.
The Body in Question (1978–79), 13 episodes.
Equinox - Prisoner of Consciousness (1986)
Born Talking: A Personal Inquiry into Language (1990), 4 episodes.
Madness (1991).
Equinox - Moving Pictures (1991)
Jonathan Miller's Opera Works (1997), 6 episodes.
Jonathan Miller on Reflection (1998).
Absolute Rubbish with Jonathan Miller (2004)
Atheism: A Rough History of Disbelief (2004), 3 episodes.
The Atheism Tapes (2004).

Interviewee
 In 1988 Miller made an extended appearance on the discussion programme After Dark, described here.
 Miller appears on the Puccini and Bach DVDs of this BBC series. In the Bach episode, he discusses his affection for the famous "Erbarme Dich" aria of the St Matthew Passion.
 Miller appears in this one-hour program on the painter.

Selected stage productions

Musical revue
Beyond the Fringe (performer, writer, producer; Edinburgh Festival; 1960).
Beyond the Fringe (performer, writer; Fortune Theatre, London; 1961–62).
Beyond the Fringe (performer, writer; John Golden Theatre. NYC; 27 October 1962 to 30 May 1964; 667 performances).

Oratorio
St Matthew Passion (Director; St. George's Theatre, London, February 1994) with Paul Goodwin. A dramatised production of J. S. Bach's masterpiece, recorded for BBC Television. This production was also revived at London's National Theatre in September/October 2011 with Southbank Sinfonia, conducted by Paul Goodwin.

Drama
The Old Glory (Director; American Place Theatre, 1964) starring Frank Langella, Roscoe Lee Brown, and Lester Rawlins.
The Merchant of Venice (Director; Cambridge Theatre, 1970) starring Laurence Olivier.
Danton's Death (Director; 1972) starring Christopher Plummer.
Long Day's Journey into Night (Director; Broadhurst Theatre, 28 April to 29 June 1986; 54 performances), starring Jack Lemmon.
Camera Obscura (Director; Almeida Theatre, 13 May to 8 June 2002; Theatre Royal, Bath, 11 to 15 June 2002; Theatre Royal, Winchester, 18 to 22 June 2002; The Oxford Playhouse 25 to 29 June 2002, starring Peter Eyre, and Diana Hardcastle.
King Lear (Director; Vivian Beaumont Theater 4 March to 18 April 2004; 33 performances).
The Cherry Orchard (Director; Crucible Theatre, 2007).

Opera
Over four decades, Miller has directed more than 50 operas in cities including London, New York, Florence, Milan, Berlin, Munich, Zurich, Valencia and Tokyo.

Così fan tutte (Stage director; Kent Opera, 1974). The first of seven operas Miller directed for Kent Opera.
Rigoletto (Stage director; 1975). Set in the 19th century.
The Cunning Little Vixen (Producer; Glyndebourne, 1975).
Le nozze di Figaro (Stage director; English National Opera, 1978). A televised version was made in 1991.
Rigoletto (Stage and video director; English National Opera, 1982). Set in 1950s Little Italy, Manhattan.
The Mikado (Stage and video director; English National Opera, 1987) starring Eric Idle.
La traviata (Stage director; Glimmerglass Opera, 1989).
Kát'a Kabanová (Stage director and producer; Metropolitan Opera, 1991).
La fanciulla del West (Stage and video director; 1991).
Pelléas et Mélisande (Stage director and producer; Metropolitan Opera, 1995).
Rodelinda (Stage director; Salomons Science Theatre, Tunbridge Wells, 1996).
The Rake's Progress (Stage director and producer; Metropolitan Opera, 1997).
Le nozze di Figaro (Stage director and producer; Metropolitan Opera, 1998).
Die Zauberflöte (Stage and video director; 2000).
Tamerlano (Stage and video director; 2001).
Die Entführung aus dem Serail (Stage and video director; 2003).
Falstaff (Stage director; New National Theatre Tokyo, 2004).
Jenůfa (Stage director; Glimmerglass Opera with New York City Opera in Cooperstown, New York, 29 July to 29 August 2006).
L'Orfeo (Stage director; Manchester and Bristol productions, 2007).
Der Rosenkavalier (Stage director; New National Theatre Tokyo, 2007).
La traviata (Stage director; Glimmerglass Opera, 2009).
La bohème (Stage director; Cincinnati Opera, 2010).
Pelléas et Mélisande (Stage director; Metropolitan Opera, 2005 and 2010).
La traviata (Director; Vancouver Opera, 2011)).
Miller's most recent opera productions in England were Cosi fan tutte and Don Pasquale at the Royal Opera House (both revived in 2012) and La bohème and L'elisir d'amore at the English National Opera. His production of Rigoletto at the ENO is still being revived after 28 years and his production of The Mikado is about to return in its 25th year. His 1987 ENO production of The Barber of Seville has often been revived, most recently in 2017.

Museum and gallery exhibitions
Miller curated an exhibition on "Reflexion" (1998) at the National Gallery and one on "Motion in Art and Photography" at the Estorick Gallery in Islington.
Miller had three exhibitions of his own art work at Flowers East, the Boundary Gallery and at the Katz Gallery in Bond Street, London.

See also
 Las Meninas – considered by Miller in his On Reflection

Notes and references

Further reading

 [A memoir by Miller's son.]

External links 

 Production details, Theatre Archive, University of Bristol
 
 
 
 
 Jonathan Miller bio. – Miller's agents
 Audio: Jonathan Miller in conversation on the BBC World Service discussion show The Forum
 What the World Thinks of God
 Jonathan Miller radio series on the origin of life – "Self Made Things"
 A six-part history of Public Health in England (includes a spill-over interview series)
 Jonathan Miller's choices on "Desert Island Discs"
 Jonathan Miller's Brief History of Disbelief
 Jonathan Miller on Language and the Mind

English theatre directors
1934 births
2019 deaths
20th-century atheists
21st-century atheists
Academics of University College London
Academics of the University of Sussex
Alumni of St John's College, Cambridge
Alumni of University College London
British atheism activists
British opera directors
British secularists
Commanders of the Order of the British Empire
Edinburgh Festival Fringe staff
English atheists
English humanists
English Jews
English male writers
English people of Lithuanian-Jewish descent
English people of Irish-Jewish descent
English satirists
English television presenters
English writers
Fellows of the Royal College of Physicians
Fellows of St John's College, Cambridge
Jewish atheists
Knights Bachelor
Laurence Olivier Award winners
Materialists
People associated with Conway Hall Ethical Society
Special Tony Award recipients
Writers from London
Waldorf school alumni
Deaths from dementia in England
Deaths from Alzheimer's disease